Hussain Muaaz (born October 1, 1985) is a Saudi football player who plays a forward .

References

1985 births
Living people
Saudi Arabian footballers
Al-Shabab FC (Riyadh) players
Al-Hazem F.C. players
Al-Riyadh SC players
Al-Nahda Club (Saudi Arabia) players
Al-Orobah FC players
Al Jeel Club players
Place of birth missing (living people)
Saudi First Division League players
Saudi Professional League players
Saudi Second Division players
Association football forwards